Station C might refer to one of two British Antarctic Survey research bases:

 Station C on Sandefjord Bay, Coronation Island
 Station C on Ferguslie Peninsula, Laurie Island